Edward Turner may refer to:
Sir Edward Turner, 1st Baronet (1691–1735), first of the Turner baronets
Sir Edward Turner, 2nd Baronet (1719–1766), British politician
Edward Turner (judge) (1778–1860), Justice of the Supreme Court of Mississippi 
Edward Turner (chemist) (1798–1837), British chemist 
Edward Beadon Turner (1854–1931), English medical administrator and rugby union international
Edward Turner (cricketer) (1858–1893), Australian cricketer
Edward C. Turner (1872–1950), American lawyer and judge in Ohio
Edward George Turner (1872–1962), British film entrepreneur
Edward Raymond Turner (1873–1903), British inventor and cinematographer
Edward Turner (footballer) (1877–?), Northern Ireland international footballer
Edward Turner (motorcycle designer) (1901–1973), British motorcycle designer.
Edward M. Turner (1918–1996), American Episcopal prelate
Ed Turner (television executive) (c. 1934–2002), CNN executive vice president
Eddie Turner (fl. 1970s–2010s), guitarist
Ed Turner (basketball) (born 1957), American basketball player

See also
Ted Turner (disambiguation)